Devils Crags is a  mountain summit located west of the crest of the Sierra Nevada mountain range, in Fresno County of central California, United States. Devils Crags ranks as the 299th highest summit in California. An approach to this remote peak is made possible via the John Muir Trail which passes through Le Conte Canyon, below to the east. The  Northwest Arête is considered one of the classic climbing routes in the Sierra Nevada.

History

This mountain was bestowed its name in 1906 by Joseph Nisbet LeConte, a Sierra Nevada explorer and cartographer. The name has been officially adopted by the United States Board on Geographic Names.

The first ascent of the highest summit, Crag 1, was made July 21, 1913, by Charles W. Michael, who in addition to being an accomplished climber, was the assistant postmaster at Yosemite Valley.

Crag 2 was first climbed July 25, 1933, by Jules Eichorn, Glen Dawson, and Ted Waller.

Crags 3 and 4 were climbed June 24, 1934, by David Brower, Hervey Voge, and Norman Clyde. The next day, June 25, this same team made the first ascents of Crags 5, 6, 7, and 8.

Crag 9 was first climbed August 1, 1933, by Glen Dawson and Jules Eichorn.

Crags 10 and 11 were first climbed June 23, 1934, by David Brower, Hervey Voge, and Norman Clyde.

Climbing
Established climbing routes for Crag 1:

 Southwest face  – 1913 by Charles Michael 
 Northwest arête – July 25, 1933, by Jules Eichorn, Helen LeConte, and Alfred Weiler
 Northeast face  – August 5, 1938, by Raffi Bedayan, Kenneth Davis, and Jack Riegelhuth

Devils Crag #1 has a bad reputation for unstable rock which has contributed directly to two climbing deaths, Mark Hoffman in 1988, and David Dykeman in 1997.

Climate
Devils Crags is located in an alpine climate zone. Most weather fronts originate in the Pacific Ocean, and travel east toward the Sierra Nevada mountains. As fronts approach, they are forced upward by the peaks, causing them to drop their moisture in the form of rain or snowfall onto the range (orographic lift). Precipitation runoff from this mountain drains into tributaries of the Middle Fork Kings River.

Gallery

See also

 List of mountain peaks of California

References

External links
 Weather forecast: Devils Crags

Mountains of Fresno County, California
Mountains of Kings Canyon National Park
North American 3000 m summits
Mountains of Northern California
Sierra Nevada (United States)